The Robert Strauss Center for International Security and Law is a nonpartisan, multidisciplinary global affairs research center at The University of Texas at Austin. The center is named for renowned lawyer and public servant Ambassador Robert S. Strauss. The Strauss Center was previously led by Robert M. Chesney until 2022, when Adam Klein, former Chairman of the United States Privacy and Civil Liberties Oversight Board, became Director.

Purpose and activities
The Robert Strauss Center for International Security and Law integrates expertise from across the University of Texas, as well as from the private and public sectors, in pursuit of practical solutions to emerging international challenges. The center sponsors a wide array of research programs and educational initiatives.

Programs
The Strauss Center supports independent research conducted by graduate students on projects related to international relations and offers several in-house research programs. The research programs focus on political instability, international security, and political violence.

Strauss Center events
The Robert Strauss Center for International Security and Law hosts a variety of events on pressing international issues facing the United States and the rest of the world. These events bring together scholars, students, and practitioners to share expertise and debate ideas. The Strauss Center encourages free and open exchange of ideas and welcomes speakers representing a wide array of views to discuss critical issues impacting international security.

Leadership
Adam Klein, Director
Robert M. Chesney, Cybersecurity Program Lead and Dean of the School of Law
Stephen Slick, Intelligence Studies Project Director
William Inboden, Associate Professor of Public Affairs and Executive Director of the Clements Center for National Security
Catherine Weaver, Associate Professor of Public Affairs
Jeremi Suri, The Mack Brown Distinguished Chair for Leadership in Global Affairs

Distinguished Scholars
David Adelman, Harry M. Reasoner Regents Chair in Law
H.W. Brands, Dickson Allen Anderson Centennial Professor of History
Gregory W. Engle
Francis Gavin, Frank Stanton Chair in Nuclear Policy
Derek Jinks, Marrs McLean Professor in Law
Vijay Mahajan, John P. Harbin Centennial Chair in Business
Michael Webber, Associate Professor of Mechanical Engineering
Moriba Jah, Associate Professor of Aerospace Engineering & Engineering Mechanics; Director of Computational Astronautical Sciences and Technologies, Institute for Computational Engineering and Sciences

External links
Robert Strauss Center

References

Research institutes in Texas
University of Texas at Austin
Legal research institutes
Research institutes of international relations